Nova.rs is a Serbian cable television channel.

Schedule

Nationally created programs

TV series
Mala istorija Srbije
Odeljenje

Documentary TV Series
SFRJ za početnike

News
Novi dnevnik

Internationally created programs

TV series
Crash (Sudar)
Labyrinth (Lavirint)
Muhteşem Yüzyıl (Sulejman Veličanstveni)
The Company (Kompanija)
The Kennedys (Kenedijevi)
The Pillars of the Earth (Stubovi zemlje)

Animated series
Professor Balthazar (Baltazar)

Documentary TV Series
Central Park: The Heart of New York (Central park, srce Njujorka)
Extreme! - Light and Dark (Ekstremno! Svetlost i tama)
Genghis Khan - Rider of the Apocalypse (Džingis Kan - Jahač apokalipse)
Hawaii - Inside Paradise (Havaji - Rajsko ostrvo)
Let it Snow! (Neka pada sneg!)
Lightning Reloaded (Munje)
Little Monsters: Hide and Cheat (Sakrij se i varaj)
Lost and Found (Izgubljen i nađen)
Sea of Creepy Monsters (More jezivih životinja)
Spirit of Ski (Duh skijanja)
The Vampire Princess (Vampirska princeza)
Zambezi (Zambezi)

References

External links

Television stations in Serbia
Television channels and stations established in 2013